The Men's 3000 metres steeplechase event at the 2013 European Athletics U23 Championships was held in Tampere, Finland, at Ratina Stadium on 12 and 14 July.

Medalists

Results

Final
14 July 2013 

Intermediate times:
1000m: 2:46.35 Fernando Carro 
2000m: 5:44.99 Fernando Carro

Heats
Qualified: First 4 in each heat (Q) and 4 best performers (q) advance to the Final

Summary

Details

Heat 1
12 July 2013 / 13:05

Intermediate times:
1000m: 2:59.32 Adriano Engelhardt 
2000m: 5:58.12 Adriano Engelhardt

Heat 2
12 July 2013 / 13:20

Intermediate times:
1000m: 3:00.74 Maksim Yakushev 
2000m: 6:01.08 Martin Grau

Participation
According to an unofficial count, 21 athletes from 15 countries participated in the event.

References

3000 metres steeplechasechase
Steeplechase at the European Athletics U23 Championships